Sopot is a village in the municipality of Kumanovo, North Macedonia. It is located near the Serbian border.

History
On the 3rd and 4th of November 1944, the village was the scene of a massacre, in which a total of 68 Albanians were killed by the   XVII Macedonian Partisan Brigade and members of the Chetnik movement.

Demographics
According to the 2002 census, the village had a total of 318 inhabitants. Ethnic groups in the village include:
Albanians 306
Serbs 6 
Macedonians 2
Bosniaks 1
Others 3

References

External links

Villages in Kumanovo Municipality
Albanian communities in North Macedonia